Sangat Island is a tiny island in the Philippines situated  off the coast of Busuanga close to Barangay Bintuan, Coron in the northern part of the Calamian Islands in the province of Palawan in the Philippines. The Calamian Islands are known for their many natural attractions and is a popular attraction for tourists and cruise lines.

Tourism is the main income for the local community and a significant part of the island has been transformed into a resort with rentable cottages and exclusive villas. The island and resort is frequented by common tourists and scuba divers who seek to explore some of the many Japanese shipwrecks still in the area around the Calamian Islands since World War II.

See also

 List of islands of the Philippines

Calamian Islands